Triponzo is a frazione of the comune of Cerreto di Spoleto in the Province of Perugia, Umbria, central Italy. It stands at an elevation of 420 metres above sea level. At the time of the Istat census of 2001 it had 45 inhabitants.

The name of the town must surely derive from Latin *Tripontium, meaning "three bridges", presumably one over each branch of the rivers; but no Roman bridge has survived. It is famous among epigraphers for a Roman inscription (CIL IX.4541 = ILLRP 1275a), carved in the live rock on the outer face of the modern SS 209 road tunnel a few hundred metres W of the town, which records the building of the Roman road from Spoletium to Nursia by order of the Roman Senate.

Triponzo is also notable for at least one medieval church, S. Caterina, and sulphureous springs, about 1.5 km (1 mi) NE of town, the water of which is considered to have therapeutic properties: a combination spa and hydroelectric facility have been under construction here since the late 20th century.

The famous Valnerina (Valley of the Nera River) in Umbria was characterized by more than 50 medieval fortifications with watchtowers. Over the years, most of the towers were lost due to war and seismic events. The tower of Triponzo was the largest of these lying at the crux of two important valleys.  Built in the 1300s it was badly damaged during the earthquake of September 1997. Given that it was one of the few remaining structures, the authorities expressed the desire to see it rebuilt in part to cancel traumatic events from memory however rebuilding the tower would have required its total demolition and removing the fallen parts would have meant an unacceptable risk for the workers. With the help of modern building technology, a new project was created by Architects Martin Stubenrauch, Moreno Orazi and Engineer Fabrizio Menghini. The fallen tower parts were stabilized, the facade preserved and a monumental modern steel spine was added to uphold and re-identify the monument in modern terms. Today the tower leaps into view upon approaching the town by roadway.  The tower is unique in its bold approach to historic reconstruction.

External links
Triponzo at LacusCurtius with photograph of the inscription

(This entry incorporates text from LacusCurtius, by permission.)

References 

Frazioni of the Province of Perugia
Cities and towns in Umbria
Roman sites of Umbria